The following is a list of all the governors of Bataan, Philippines, from 1901 to the present.

List of governors of Bataan

References

Politics of Bataan
Governors of provinces of the Philippines